Hawaii's 2nd congressional district is a congressional district in the U.S. state of Hawaii. It is represented by Jill Tokuda, who succeeded Kai Kahele after the 2022 election. The district encompasses all rural and most suburban areas of Oahu/Honolulu County, as well as the entire state outside of Oahu. It includes the counties of Kauai, Maui, Kalawao, and Hawaii ("the Big Island"). The district spans 331 miles. The most populous community entirely within the district is Hilo. Major segments of the economy include tourism, ranching, and agriculture.

Under the U.S. Constitution, a candidate for this district has to be a resident of Hawaii, but does not have to live in the district itself. The first non-resident elected to this seat was Ed Case, a Honolulu attorney, though he was born and raised on the Big Island of Hawaii. The home state office of the Second Congressional District is at the Prince Kuhio Federal Building near Honolulu Harbor.

History
When Hawaii and Alaska were admitted to the Union in 1959, both new states were granted one at-large representative to Congress pending the next United States Census. In the reapportionment following the 1960 U.S. Census, Hawaii gained a second U.S. representative. Instead of creating two congressional districts, the state continued to elect its U.S. representatives at large. Two representatives were first elected in 1962, and Hawaii was first represented by two U.S. representatives on January 2, 1963, upon the convening of the 88th Congress. The 2nd congressional district was created in 1971 when Hawaii began electing its representatives from districts instead of electing at-large representatives statewide.

The 2nd congressional district has a Cook Partisan Voting Index of D+14. It has supported the Democratic nominee in every presidential election since 1988, and has never elected a Republican U.S. representative. In October 2019, Representative Tulsi Gabbard announced that she would not seek reelection, instead choosing to focus on her campaign for the Democratic presidential nomination.

In January 2019, Hawaii state senator Kai Kahele announced he would run for the seat in 2020. Other Democrats who announced were David Cornejo, Brian Evans (a self-described "Berniecrat" who ran for the seat as a Republican in 2018), Noelle Famera, and Ryan Meza. Republicans Joseph Akana and Jonathan Hoomanawanui also announced. Kahele won the Democratic nomination on August 8 and the general election on November 3.

Recent results from statewide races

List of members representing the district

Election results

1970

1972

1974

1976

1978

1980

1982

1984

1986

1988

1990 (Special)

1990

1992

1994

1996

1998

2000

2002

2002 (Special)

2003 (Special)

2004

2006

2008

2010

2012

2014

2016

2018

2020

2022

Historical district boundaries

See also

Hawaii's congressional districts
List of United States congressional districts

References

 Congressional Biographical Directory of the United States 1774–present

2
Tulsi Gabbard